The Penglaizhen Formation, is a geological formation in Sichuan, China. It was formerly thought to be Late Jurassic in age. However, the underlying Suining Formation has been dated to the Mid Cretaceous, so the formation must be this age or later However a subsequent study suggested that the dates for the formation had been altered by geologic processes, and there dating the Suining Formation to the around the Jurassic Cretaceous boundary about 145 Ma, which means that Penglaizhen Formation is likely Early Cretaceous in age. Dinosaur remains are among the fossils that have been recovered from the formation.

Vertebrate paleofauna 
Indeterminate ornithischian tracks have been recovered from Penglaizhen outcrops in Sichuan, China.

See also 
 List of dinosaur-bearing rock formations

References 

Geologic formations of China
Cretaceous System of Asia
Cretaceous China
Ichnofossiliferous formations
Paleontology in Sichuan